Aruba S.p.A. is an Italian company mainly active in the web hosting and domain registration businesses. It is the market leader in Italy, and also has a large market share in the Czech Republic and Slovakia.

References 

Technology companies established in 1994
Internet technology companies of Italy

Domain name registrars
Web hosting